Chloroclystis nereis is a moth in the family Geometridae. It was described by Edward Meyrick in 1888. It is endemic to New Zealand. The habitat consists of mountainous areas.

The wings are dusky grey with numerous black and dull white wavy transverse lines. Adults are on wing in January and February.

The larvae feed inside the flower heads of Celmisia lindsayi. Adult moths have been shown to pollinate Celmisia discolor, Celmisia gracilenta and Helichrysum selago.

References

External links

Citizen science observations

Moths described in 1888
nereis
Moths of New Zealand
Endemic fauna of New Zealand
Taxa named by Edward Meyrick
Endemic moths of New Zealand